Soroptimist International (SI) was founded in 1921 as a global volunteer service club|service organization for women with nearly 72,000 members in 121 countries worldwide. Soroptimist International also offers Associate Membership and E-Clubs.

There are five Soroptimist Federations under the umbrella of Soroptimist International: Soroptimist International Africa Federation (SIAF), Soroptimist International of the Americas (SIA), Soroptimist International of Europe (SIE), Soroptimist International of Great Britain & Ireland (SIGBI) and Soroptimist International of South East Asia Pacific (SISEAP). 

Soroptimist International has special consultative status at the Economic and Social Council (ECOSOC) at the United Nations which gives it a voice on important discussion papers and allows them to attend the Commission of the Status of Women in New York each year to where the Soroptimist International President leads a delegation.

Every two years Soroptimist International launches a Soroptimist International President's Appeal.

Etymology
The name "Soroptimist" was coined by combining the Latin words  "sister" and  "best", and can be taken to mean "best for women".

Founding and history
The organisation has its roots in the Soroptimist movement, started in the USA in 1921 by Stuart Morrow, and in particular in the Soroptimist Club of Oakland, California, founded that same year, with Violet Richardson as president.

In May 1920, a Venture Club was formed in Bristol (UK) with encouragement by the Rotary Club (formed in Bristol in 1917) with Eleanor Addison Phillips (Headmistress of Clifton High School) as founder and its First President. In 1930, when it was realised that Venture Clubs and Soroptimist Clubs had shared goals, the two organisations amalgamated. (Reference ‘100 Years of Sisterhood: Bristol Fashion’ by Dr Marion Reid - Redcliffe Press). In July 2021, to commemorate 100 years of the Bristol Club, a blue plaque was unveiled at Clifton High School in Bristol, celebrating Eleanor Addison Phillips.

The Federation, Soroptimist International of Great Britain & Ireland (SIGBI) was formed in 1934.

Sources agree that the Soroptimist movement was influenced by the existence of Rotarianism, but differ on the precise relationship between the two. For instance, Davis, in reference to early Soroptimism in the USA, wrote that Soroptimism was a women's organisation connected to the Rotary Clubs for men that promoted the support of professional women as well as the ideals of service and internationalism. By contrast, Doughan wrote that the Soroptimist movement in Britain originally arose as a reaction against Rotarian and other masculinism among women who saw similar opportunities for service, but had no connection with Rotary men, or even if they did, were unwilling to accept the subordinate position implied by the structure of the Inner Wheel.

The Soroptimist Club of London was started in 1923 and received its charter in 1924 from Morrow. Its founding members included George Bernard Shaw's secretary. Other early members included Sybil Thorndike, Flora Drummond, and Mary Allen. The Soroptimist International of London Mayfair commissioned a painted enamel President's badge in 1946 from Arts and Crafts enameller Ernestine Mills, paying seven guineas for it. The design included their founding date of 1942 and commemorates the Alpha Club, founded in 1928, from which they grew, with the chain listing the names of the club's presidents from 1942 to 2006. These included Olympic fencer Elizabeth Carnegy-Arbuthnott and comedian Helena Millais. The chain is now held at the V&A Museum. Mills was a member of the Soroptimist Greater London club, for which she created an enamelled President's badge in 1933.

From 1924 onwards, Suzanne Noël was highly instrumental in the growth of Soroptimism. Inspired by Morrow, who had come to Paris, Noël founded a Soroptimist Club in that city that year, whose membership included Thérèse Bertrand-Fontaine, Cécile Brunschvicg, Anna de Noailles, and Jeanne Lanvin Alice La Mazière. With the support of her Soroptimist contacts, Noël rapidly expanded Soroptimist internationally, founding new clubs in the Netherlands (1927), Italy (1929), Austria (1929), Germany (1930), Belgium (1930), Switzerland (1930), Estonia (1931), India (1932), Norway (1933), Hungary (1934), and Denmark (1936). The inauguration of the first Lithuanian club was interrupted by the start of WWII.

Prior to WWII, Soroptimists worked to assist refugees fleeing unrest in central Europe. Many Soroptimists themselves ultimately fled from the Nazis' consolidation of power, to seek safety elsewhere. Some were less fortunate. In 1939, many members of the burgeoning Kaunas club were killed or deported. In 1943, Marthe Hirsch, the director of a chocolate factory and the first president of the Belgian Soroptimist Club, committed suicide to avoid arrest by the Gestapo.

After WWII, Noël resumed expansion. Her attempt to found a club in Czechoslovakia in 1948 was prevented by the Communist coup, but she was successful in Turkey (1949) and Greece (1950).

By 1952, at least one club existed in Australia, under the auspices of the Federation of Soroptimist Clubs of Great Britain and Ireland, which included clubs throughout the Commonwealth. Thelma Eileen Jarrett joined this club in 1952 and became a prominent international Soroptimist, being elected president of that Federation in 1972. In 1973, in Sydney, Australia, she chaired the first conference of the Federation to be held in the southern hemisphere.

C. 1988-1990, efforts by Soroptimists led to the founding of Caring for Carers Ireland.

At the World Summit for Social Development in March 1995, Soroptimist International advocated for girls and women to have universal access to basic education and equal access to higher education. It urged that summit to ensure that specific measures to achieve that goal would emerge from the Fourth World Conference on Women (Beijing, September 1995).

In the 2000s, Soroptimist International repeatedly reaffirmed its commitment to the Beijing Declaration, which emerged from the latter conference.

At least as early as 2003, Soroptimist International had gained consultative status with ECOSOC and official relations with the WHO.

In 2007, Soroptimist International initiated Project Sierra, a four-year project to help disadvantaged women and children in Sierra Leone, in partnership with the international charity Hope and Homes for Children.

As of 2016, the Soroptimist movement continued to advocate for women's independence, and to provide practical assistance for women in need via means such as educational grants, domestic violence shelters and mammograms.

Mission and principles

The mission statement of the organization is:

The principles of Soroptimism are to strive for:
 The advancement of the status of women,
 High ethical standards,
 Human rights for all,
 Equality, development and peace, and
 The advancement of international understanding, goodwill and peace.

Structure and size
Soroptimist International is an umbrella organisation, with its headquarters in Cambridge, UK.

Within this umbrella, there are five federations: SI of the Americas (SIA); SI Great Britain and Ireland (SIGBI); SI of Europe (SIE); SI of South East Asia Pacific (SISEAP) and SI Africa (SIA).

Each of these federations in turn contain local clubs.

Notable members

 Mary Allen
 Thérèse Bertrand-Fontaine
 Margaret Blackwood
 Pauline Suing Bloom
 Nadia Boulanger
 Cécile Brunschvicg
 Teckla M. Carlson
 Grace Cuthbert-Browne
 Mary Campbell Dawbarn
 Lucie Delarue-Mardrus
 Flora Drummond
 Nannie C. Dunsmoor
 Béatrix Dussane
 Oda Faulconer, President
 Nellie A. Goodhue
 Winifred M. Hausam
 Thelma Eileen Jarrett
 Jeanne Lanvin
 Lily Laskine
 Carrie Morrison
 Anna de Noailles
 Suzanne Noël
 Geneve L. A. Shaffer
 Mary Jane Spurlin
 Mary Sykes
 Sybil Thorndike
 Violet Richardson Ward
 Ida V. Wells
 Madrid Williams

See also
 Feminism
 Soroptimist Park

References

Bibliography

External links
 
 

1921 establishments in California
International women's organizations
International nongovernmental organizations
Organizations established in 1921
Peace organisations based in the United Kingdom
Service organizations